Kebbi attack may refer to:

2021 Kebbi massacre, in June 2021
Kebbi kidnapping, in June 2021
Dankade massacre, in January 2022
March 2022 Kebbi massacres, in March 2022